"Foreign Affair" is a song written by Maggie Reilly and Mike Oldfield, which first appeared on Oldfield's 1983 album Crises on Virgin Records.

The song was originally recorded during the Crises sessions between November 1982 and April 1983 at Oldfield's studio in Denham, Buckinghamshire. On "Foreign Affair", Oldfield plays a Fairlight CMI and Roland strings. Maggie Reilly provides vocals, and the co-producer Simon Phillips plays Tama Drums and a shaker.

Oldfield performed the song on tour extensively in the 1980s. The song has since been featured on compilations such as The Platinum Collection, Collection, Elements Boxset and Elements – The Best of Mike Oldfield.

Sylver cover

In 2009 the Belgian group Sylver covered "Foreign Affair" on their fifth album, Sacrifice. The song reached number three on the Belgian Singles Chart. The song was released in Germany on 20 November 2009, but only as a download.

Track listing
 "Foreign Affair" (Radio Edit) – 3:14
 "Foreign Affair" (Album Version) – 6:26
 "Foreign Affair" (Hardwell Remix) – 7:06
 "Foreign Affair" (Cliff Coenraad Repimp) – 7:23

Charts

References

External links
"Foreign Affair" at Tubular.net

1983 songs
2009 singles
Mike Oldfield songs
Sylver songs
Songs written by Mike Oldfield
Songs written by Maggie Reilly
Universal Music Group singles